Björn Berglund (16 October 1904 – 3 August 1968) was a Swedish stage and film and television actor.

Biography
Björn Nils Johan Gustaf Berglund was born in Jörn, Västerbotten County. He began his career in cinema in the 1939 Edvin Adolphson-directed musical film Säg det i toner (English release title: The Dream Waltz) starring Håkan Westergren and Stina Berg. His career would span nearly four decades and he would appear in over seventy-five films. He died in Sweden at 1968 at age 63.

Selected filmography
 Say It with Music (1929)
 The Southsiders (1932)
 His Life's Match (1932)
 Fridolf in the Lion's Den (1933)
 Saturday Nights (1933)
 Andersson's Kalle (1934)
 Swedenhielms (1935)
 Shipwrecked Max (1936)
 Johan Ulfstjerna (1936)
 The Andersson Family (1937)
 Conflict (1937)
 Baldwin's Wedding (1938)
 Storm Over the Skerries (1938)
 Emilie Högquist (1939)
 Bashful Anton (1940)
 Woman on Board (1941)
 The Heavenly Play (1942)
 Sun Over Klara (1942)
 Tomorrow's Melody (1942)
 Life and Death (1943)
 Kungajakt (1944)
 My People Are Not Yours (1944)
 Motherhood (1945)
 Number 17 (1949)
 The Street (1949)
 Vagabond Blacksmiths (1949)
 Two Stories Up (1950)
 The Saucepan Journey (1950)
 Dangerous Spring (1949)
 Poker (1951)
 In Lilac Time (1952)
 Encounter with Life (1952)
 Defiance (1952)
 House of Women (1953)
 Ursula, the Girl from the Finnish Forests (1953)
 Bill Bergson and the White Rose Rescue (1953)
 Luffaren och Rasmus (1955)
 Voyage in the Night (1955)
 Ön (1956)
 Stage Entrance (1956)
 Night Child (1956)
 The Minister of Uddarbo (1957)
 Vägen genom Skå (1957)
 Three Men in Search of a Troll (1967)

Bibliography
 Wright, Rochelle. The Visible Wall: Jews and Other Ethnic Outsiders in Swedish Film. SIU Press, 1998.

External links

1904 births
1968 deaths
Swedish male film actors
Swedish male stage actors
Swedish male television actors
20th-century Swedish male actors
People from Skellefteå Municipality